Whenever You're Ready may refer to:

 Whenever You're Ready (album), a 1993 album by Flop
 "Whenever You're Ready" (The Zombies song), 1965
 "Whenever You're Ready" (Five Star song), 1987
 "Whenever You're Ready" (The Good Place), the series finale of The Good Place